Chen Feng Huai  (1900–1993), also spelled Chen Feng Hwai, was a Chinese botanist known primarily for his contributions to the construction and administration of botanical gardens in China. 

Chen was born in 1900.  He was the great grandson of Chen Baozhen, governor of Hunan. He once studied at Royal Botanical Garden of Edinburgh in the 1930s.  After he returned to China, he held a position at Nanchang University.

He contributed greatly to the construction of botanical gardens in China.  He was the director and a founder of the following gardens:

Mountain Lu Botanical Garden
Zhongshan (Sun Yat-sen) Botanical Garden in Nanjing
Wuhan Botanical Garden
South China Botanical Garden

Chen died in 1993 and was buried at Lushan Botanical Garden in his beloved place, both of his career and of his family residence, along with two colleagues, Hu Xiansu and Ren-Chang Ching.

References

1900 births
1993 deaths
Botanists active in China
20th-century Chinese botanists
Biologists from Jiangsu
Scientists from Nanjing